George Augustus Chichester, 2nd Marquess of Donegall KP, PC (Ire) (14 August 1769 – 5 October 1844), styled Viscount Chichester until 1791 and Earl of Belfast from 1791 to 1799, was an Anglo-Irish nobleman and politician.

He was born into an Ulster aristocratic family at St James's, Westminster, and served for less than a year as a representative in the Irish House of Commons for Carrickfergus before succeeding his father as second Marquess of Donegall in 1799.

Lord Donegall was admitted to the Irish Privy Council in 1803 and later served as Lord Lieutenant of County Donegal from 1831 until his death. He was also made a Knight of the Order of St Patrick in 1821 on the occasion of King George IV's visit to Ireland

A lifelong gambler, Lord Donegall married the daughter of Edward May, a moneylender and owner of a gambling house. This may have been an agreement to resolve some debts. In 1818 it came to light that Anna May was illegitimate and had been underage when she married. The result of a 1753 law meant that the marriage was invalid which would have disinherited the children from the titles. Proceedings were put in place to resolve the situation but it was the changing of the marriage act in 1822 which allowed the eldest son to retain his place in the inheritance.

Lord Donegall died heavily in debt in 1844 at his home at Ormeau, County Down (which formed the basis of Ormeau Park), and was buried in St Nicholas's Church, Carrickfergus.

References

External links

1769 births
1844 deaths
Irish MPs 1798–1800
Knights of St Patrick
Lord-Lieutenants of Donegal
Belfast, George Chichester, Earl of
Members of the Privy Council of Ireland
George
2